Yangxin County is a county within the prefecture-level city of Huangshi in southeastern Hubei province, People's Republic of China. The county is mostly rural but is more prosperous than its neighbor, Tongshan County. According to the Fifth Population Census of China (2000), the county's population was 949,102 giving it a population density of 341 people per square kilometer.

History
Yangxin has seven neolithic sites and eight Shang-Zhou Dynasties sites. In 201 BC, the county was built as Xiazhi; the name "Yangxin" first appeared during the Jin Dynasty.

From the Northern and Southern dynasties period, Hubei province became a noteworthy tea-producing area. It became Xingguo Army during the Song Dynasty. During this period, Confucian schools were introduced into Xingguo. In the Yuan Dynasty, it was called Xingguo Road and had the biggest silver production among all roads in Hubei. During the Qing Dynasty the Yangxin area became Xingguo Prefecture.

In the late Qing Dynasty, Yangxin County served as the headquarters for the west march of Taiping Heavenly Kingdom. The prefecture was turned into a county in 1912 and changed its name to Yangxin County in 1914. In 1926, a Communist Party of China committee was established, and Yangxin became a center of communist activities in Southeast Hubei. In the Second Sino-Japanese War, the people of Yangxin formed four counter-Japanese base areas and fought the Battle of Wuhan in order to protect Wuhan. Yangxin was occupied by the 43rd Army, 15th Legion, Fourth Field Army of the People's Liberation Army on May 16, 1949.

Administrative divisions
Township-level divisions:
Xingguo, Fuchi, Huangsangkou, Weiyuankou (), Taizi, Dawang, Taogang, Baisha, Futu, Sanxi, Longgang, Yanggang, Paishi, Mugang, Fenglin, Wangying

Geography

Yangxin county occupies the southern half of the Huangshi City, bordering on Jiangxi in the south, with Tongshan County in the west. The Yangtze River flows along the county's eastern border.

The southern part of the county, located in the foothills of the Mufu Mountains, is riddled with many small hills.

The county's main urban area is Xingguo Town—usually referred to simply as Yangxin, as is normally the case in Chinese counties. Other large towns include Longgang and Futu.

Climate

Infrastructure

Road network

The main transportation artery of the county is China National Highway 106 which is also known as China National Highway 316 within the county. However, it does not pass through the Yangxin county seat, Xingguo town; the town is served by Hubei Provincial Highway 316 (not to be confused with the national highway of the same number).

Transport
Yangxin railway station is located on the Wuhan–Jiujiang railway, which runs from Wuhan to Jiujiang, Jiangxi. A number of passenger trains running from the Wuchang (or sometimes Hankou) station in Wuhan stop at the Yangxin Railway Station. The train regularly stops at the Huangshi station, Ezhou, and Huazhong.

References

External links

 
Counties of Hubei
Huangshi